Jasper Motorsports was a NASCAR Winston Cup team. It was owned by a variety of owners including D.K. Ulrich and Doug Bawel.

1970s–1980s 
The car started in 1971 at what turned out to be the only Winston Cup race at Smoky Mountain Raceway as the No. 41 Ford owned and driven by Ulrich, who finished 29th out of 30 cars for heating problems on the 4th lap. Ulrich ran full-time for a couple of years, but normally he stepped aside and let other drivers race for him. During his tenure as an owner, he employed many younger drivers. Sterling Marlin, Tim Richmond, Morgan Shepherd, and Mark Martin all went on to successful careers after piloting Ulrich's car.

In 1987, Ulrich noticed a young short track driver from California named Ernie Irvan, who qualified 20th in a Dale Earnhardt-sponsored car for a race that Ulrich didn't make. Ulrich put the aggressive young Irvan in his car for three races that year, with Irvan's partner Marc Reno as crew chief. When Ulrich was able to get Kroger as a full-time sponsor for the team, he fielded the car full-time in 1988 with Irvan competing for NASCAR Winston Cup Series Rookie of the Year in the No. 2 Chevrolet/Pontiac, finishing 59 points behind Ken Bouchard for Rookie of the Year. In 1989, Irvan posted 4-top ten finishes and ending the season 22nd in points, three better than the previous year. Unfortunately, Kroger decided not to renew its contract, and Irvan had no choice but to leave the team. Ulrich was able to get several different sponsorships together for 1990, and the team ran most of the races.

1990s 

The car returned full-time for 1991 as the No. 55 Pontiac sponsored by Jasper Engines, based in Jasper, Indiana. The team's original plan was a Winston Cup rookie campaign for popular USAC veteran and Indianapolis 500 starter Rich Vogler, but he perished while leading a USAC event at the Salem Speedway in Indiana in July 1990. Their next choice was Wisconsin's Ted Musgrave, who narrowly missed Rookie of the Year honors to Bobby Hamilton. During the 1992 and 1993 NASCAR seasons, Ulrich formed a partnership with Ray DeWitt to form RaDiUs Motorsports which continued with Musgrave behind the wheel.  During the 1992 season, the team ran various makes from General Motors before switching to Ford halfway through the year.  In 1994 Musgrave left for Roush Racing and Ulrich and DeWitt ended their partnership.  DeWitt formed a new team with the RaDiUS name and No. 55 while Ulrich retained the Jasper sponsorship on the newly renumbered No. 77, with Doug Bawel, an executive from Jasper Engines & Transmissions, became a business partner with Ulrich, the team being renamed Jasper Motorsports with veteran journeyman Greg Sacks handling the driving chores as well as a major co-sponsorship from USAir. Jasper Engines & Transmissions co-sponsored the team for the 1995 season, with the car originally piloted by rookie Davy Jones and later Bobby Hillin Jr. After the season, Bawel bought the entire team from Ulrich and started a partnership with Jasper salesmen Mark Wallace and Mark Harrah. Hillin continued to drive the car for 1996, and the first part of 1997, before being replaced by Robert Pressley and Morgan Shepherd.

Pressley was full-time for 1998, during which he had a then-career-best finish of 3rd at Texas. 1999 was a tumultuous year for the team, struggling with qualifying and finishing 39th in points. For the 2000 season, the team began using Penske engines and hired Ryan Pemberton as crew chief. Change made a huge difference as Pressley finished 25th in points the next two years, finishing 2nd at the 2001 Tropicana 400 at Chicagoland Speedway.

2000s 
Pressley, although picking up a few top-tens during his tenure with Jasper, struggled with consistency, even with his successful pairing with Pemberton. Therefore, Pressley and Jasper parted ways after the season, and former sprint car champion Dave Blaney was tabbed to replace him. But Blaney, while competitive in some races also struggled with consistency and was gone at the end of 2003.

Boris Said drove a No. 67 car on road courses and as a teammate to Blaney in 2002, finishing a best of 8th at Watkins Glen. The car is featured in the widely popular video game NASCAR Racing 2003 Season.

At the end of the year, Wallace sold his share of the team, and Roger Penske, who was already providing engines and support to the Jasper team, took his place. The team got a new sponsor in Kodak, as well as a new driver in rookie Brendan Gaughan and a new manufacturer in Dodge (the team had ran Dodge instead of the usual Ford for the 2003 EA Sports 500, causing Ford to pull their factory support). Despite grabbing 4 top-10 finishes, Gaughan was replaced to the shock of fans by another rookie, Travis Kvapil. In his first year in the Cup circuit, he finished 32nd in points with two top-10 finishes. When the season came to a close, it was announced the No. 77 car would not run the 2006 season, as Penske would go back to fielding two cars in his own team.

Not long after the announcement, the team shut down and sold its owner's points to Bill Davis, who fielded car No. 55 for Michael Waltrip for the 2006 season. After 2006, Waltrip bought the 55 team and Michael Waltrip Racing became a full-time Nextel Cup team.

Driver history 
Notable drivers (Winston Cup Champions, Rookies of the Year, and Cup race winners) are highlighted in bold.
 D. K. Ulrich (1971–1975, 1978–1987, 1990)
 Roy Mayne (1971)
 Dick May (1971, 1980–1982)
 Frank Warren (1973)
 Harry Schilling (1974)
 Ed Negre (1974)
 Tony Bettenhausen Jr. (1974)
 Randy Bethea (1975)
 Al Elmore (1979, 1983)
 Bill Whittington (1980)
 Joe Booher (1980–1982, 1986)
 Ricky Rudd (1980)
 Dick Skillen (1980)
 Mike Alexander (1980)
 J. D. McDuffie (1980)
 Tommy Gale (1980, 1981, 1983)
 Lennie Pond (1980)
 Sterling Marlin (1980, 1981)
 Tim Richmond (1980–1981)
 Harry Dinwiddie (1980)
 Stan Barrett (1980, 1982)
 Chuck Bown (1981)
 Rick Baldwin (1981)
 Kevin Housby (1981)
 Al Loquasto (1981, 1982)
 Terry Herman (1981, 1982)
 Rick Knoop (1981, 1986, 1987)
 Cecil Gordon (1981)
 Elliott Forbes-Robinson (1981)
 Slick Johnson (1981–1982)
 Bob McElee (1981)
 Ronnie Thomas (1981)
 Don Hume (1981)
 Tommy Houston (1982)
 Jimmy Hensley (1982)
 Ferrel Harris (1982)
 Randy Becker (1982)
 Bob Jarvis (1982)
 Jim Sauter (1983, 1984, 1990)
 Mark Martin (1983)
 Connie Saylor (1983, 1984, 1987)
 Morgan Shepherd (1984, 1997)
 Jimmy Ingalls (1984)
 Clark Dwyer (1984)
 Doug Heveron (1984)
 Eddie Bierschwale (1985, 1990)
 Trevor Boys (1986–1987)
 Richard Petty (one race in 1986)
 Bobby Baker (1987)
 Ron Esau (1987)
 Ernie Irvan (1987–1989)
 Rick Mast (1990)
 Jim Bown (1990)
 Troy Beebe (1990)
 Charlie Glotzbach (1990)
 Rick Ware (1990)
 Jerry O'Neil (1990)
 Ted Musgrave (1990–1993, 1998)
 Greg Sacks (1994)
 P. J. Jones (1994)
 Davy Jones (1995)
 Bobby Hillin Jr. (1995–1997)
 Robert Pressley (1997–2001)
 Hut Stricklin (1998)
 Boris Said (2001–2002; road races only)
 Dave Blaney (2002–2003)
 Brendan Gaughan (2004)
 Travis Kvapil (2005)

References

External links 
Doug Bawel Winston Cup/Nextel Cup Owner Statistics
D.K. Ulrich Winston Cup Owner Statistics

Companies based in North Carolina
Defunct NASCAR teams
American auto racing teams
Defunct companies based in North Carolina
Auto racing teams established in 1971
Auto racing teams disestablished in 2006